Siro is a genus of mite harvestmen in the family Sironidae. There are at least 20 described species in Siro.

Species
These 20 species belong to the genus Siro:

 Siro acaroides (Ewing, 1923) i c g b
 Siro beschkovi Mitov, 1994 g
 Siro boyerae Giribet & Shear, 2010 i c g b
 Siro calaveras Giribet & Shear, 2010 i c g b
 Siro carpaticus Rafalski, 1956 g
 Siro clousi Giribet & Shear, 2010 i c g b
 Siro crassus g
 Siro duricorius (Joseph, 1868) g
 Siro eratoae Juberthie, 1968 g
 Siro exilis Hoffman, 1963 i c g b
 Siro gjorgievici Hadzi, 1933 g
 Siro kamiakensis (Newell, 1943) i c g b
 Siro minutus Kratochvil, 1938 g
 Siro noctiphilus Kratochvil, 1940 g
 Siro rubens Latreille, 1804 g
 Siro shasta Giribet & Shear, 2010 i c g b
 Siro silhavyi Kratochvil, 1938 g
 Siro sonoma Shear, 1980 i c g b
 Siro teyrovskyi Kratochvil, 1938 g
 Siro valleorum Chemini, 1989 g

Data sources: i = ITIS, c = Catalogue of Life, g = GBIF, b = Bugguide.net

References

Further reading

 

Harvestmen
Articles created by Qbugbot